Constantine "Con" Slobodchikoff (born April 23, 1944) is an animal behaviorist and conservation biologist. He is a professor at Northern Arizona University where he studies referential communication, using Gunnison's prairie dogs (Cynomys gunnisoni) as a model species. Much of his recent research has shown a complex communicative ability of the Gunnison prairie dog alarm calls. In early 2008 he formed the Animal language Institute  to create a place where people can find and share research in animal communication, including language.

Background 
He was born in Shanghai, China, to Russian émigré parents.  His father was a surgeon and when he came across a highly placed citizen who needed help, his father and the highly placed citizen made a deal, he would heal him in exchange for visas for his whole family to go to America. The family arrived in the United States December 5, 1955, and settled in San Francisco. Slobodchikoff's early love of biology was fostered by his membership in his teenage years in the Student Section of the California Academy of Sciences, where he went on numerous field trips to different habitats in California. He received an A.A. degree from City College of San Francisco in 1964, and a B.S. in 1966 and Ph.D. degree in 1971, both from the University of California, Berkeley. After receiving his Ph.D., Slobodchikoff joined the biology faculty of Northern Arizona University, where he was a tenured professor with a research budget of $1,000 per year. He also was a Fulbright Fellow and a visiting professor at Kenyatta University in Kenya in 1983.

His wife, Anne Eustis Slobodchikoff, taught French and Russian at Northern Arizona University, and they both retired in 2010. They have a son Michael, chair of the Political Science Department at Troy University. His older sister, Irene V. Barrese, was an estate lawyer in San Francisco.

Research

Beetles
His initial research involved the behavior and ecology of tenebrionid beetles and their response to vertebrate predators.

Prairie dogs
In the mid-1980s he switched his research efforts to studying the social behavior and communication of prairie dogs. He has been decoding the communication system of alarm calls, and he and his students have found that prairie dogs have a sophisticated communication system that can identify the species of predator and provides descriptive information about the size, shape, and color of the individual predator animal. His research in prairie dog communication has also shown displacement, the ability to communicate about things that are not present. This finding challenges prior theories on animal communication, since only humans had been known to use this linguistic process. In addition, his work with prairie dogs shows they also have different escape behaviors in response to the specific predators identified in the calls of other prairie dogs, even when the predator itself is not visible or scented (ie. based purely on recorded calls). His research with prairie dogs also helps to explain why animals have social behavior. Because these animals form a colony, they form a set of different social groups, which apparently exist for other reasons besides mating and may be a way to take advantage of limited resources.

Through Slobodchikoff's research, it has been found that prairie dogs also have the ability to construct new words referring to novel objects or animals in their environment, which is called productivity. Prior to the study, only humans had been recognized with the ability of productivity within a communication system. Slobodchikoff and his research team are currently taking a look at breaking down the grammar of prairie dogs through computer technology to better understand the nature of their vocalizations in comparison to the phoneme system used by humans. Through this approach, they have been able to find how these vocalizations are put together to construct word-like structures and further constructed to form sentences.

Slobodchikoff has supported preserving the habitats of prairie dogs. One specific area that has evidence of the destruction of their environment is New Mexico. An organization, Prairie Dog Pals, has dedicated themselves to prevent the suburban expansion that threatens the dog's lifestyles. Prairie Dogs are seen as bothersome creatures to government employees. They are viewed as a threat to home owners and the general public by digging burrows into parks and playgrounds. As a capstone species, their extinction will be the cause of the extinction of other creatures. Drastic measures such as poisoning, bulldozing and drowning their habitats have been implemented by housing and shopping center expansion. This has caused a major push in Slobodchikoff research, because of his drive to inform society of how intelligent these remarkable creatures are, and how they can really can contribute to further research.

Slobodchikoff has examined the language, communication, and social behavior of prairie dogs for more than forty years. He selected prairie dogs as the main focus of his research because he believes they have a high degree of social behavior and are easy to study due to their close proximity. The prairie dogs live near the university where Slobodchikoff teaches, Northern Arizona University.

Dogs
He also researches dogs' communication and writes a Dog Behavior Blog which gives some advice on how to solve behavior issues and has several short essays about some of the research about dogs and dog behavior. He has taken what he has learned from the findings of his research with prairie dogs to offer consultations about problems that pets may have with behavior and offer advice to correct those problems. He has also offered dog training classes based on what he has learned in his research.

Published Writings 
Slobodchikoff has published numerous papers in animal behavior, ecology, and evolution. One of his better known papers on evolution, published with Thomas G. Whitham in 1981 in the journal Oecologia, was "Evolution of individuals, plant-herbivore interactions, and mosaics of genetic variability: the adaptive significance of somatic mutations in plants". A seminal paper on prairie dog communication was published in 1991 in the journal Animal Behaviour: "Semantic information distinguishing individual predators in the alarm calls of Gunnison's prairie dogs". He has been editor or co-editor of several books, including Concepts of Species, A New Ecology: Novel Approaches to Interactive Systems, and The Ecology of Social Behavior. He is lead author, along with Bianca S. Perla and Jennifer L. Verdolin, of the book: Prairie Dogs: Communication and Community in an Animal Society, published by Harvard University Press. 
His book Learning the Language of Animals – Chasing Doctor Dolittle was published by St. Martin's Press in November 2012.

Media 
Slobodchikoff's work with the prairie dog communication system has been featured in a number of video productions, magazines, radio interviews, and newspaper accounts. His video appearances included: NBC Dateline, ABC World News with Peter Jennings, CNN, Country Canada, Quantum (Australian Broadcasting Corporation), Teirzeit (Belgian-German TV), BBC, Turner Broadcasting, Brixen Productions (Discovery Channel), Evolve (History Channel). Radio interviews have been with: NPR All Things Considered, BBC radio, PBS Flagstaff, Phoenix, Santa Fe, Idaho, and Colorado. Magazine stories about his work have appeared in: Smithsonian Magazine, National Geographic, People Magazine, Discover Magazine, the Phoenician, Best Friends Magazine, Boys' Life, Reader's Digest. Newspaper stories about his work have appeared in: LA Times, Boston Globe, Denver Post, Arizona Republic, Arizona Daily Sun, Arizona Daily Star, Washington Post, NY Times, among others.

References

External links 
 Northern Arizona University home page http://jan.ucc.nau.edu/~cns3/
 Animal Language Institute http://www.animallanguageinstitute.org/
 Reconnect with Nature Blog http://www.reconnectwithnatureblog.com/

Northern Arizona University faculty
University of California, Berkeley alumni
American people of Russian descent
Living people
Chinese emigrants to the United States
20th-century American zoologists
American mammalogists
American science writers
American male non-fiction writers
Ethologists
Scientists from California
1944 births